Tomasz Kazimierz Tomczykiewicz (2 March 1961 – 28 November 2015) was a Polish politician. He was elected to the Sejm on 25 September 2005, getting 22,221 votes in 27 Bielsko-Biała district as a candidate from the Civic Platform list, and again in 2015 for the 8th Sejm.

He was also a member of Sejm 2001–2005, Sejm 2005–2007, Sejm 2007–2011. He was admitted to a hospital on 25 November 2015 with a kidney ailment and died three days later.

See also
Members of Polish Sejm 2005–2007
Members of Polish Sejm 2007–2011

References

External links

Tomasz Tomczykiewicz - parliamentary page - includes declarations of interest, voting record, and transcripts of speeches.

Members of the Polish Sejm 2005–2007
Members of the Polish Sejm 2001–2005
Members of the Polish Sejm 2007–2011
Civic Platform politicians
1961 births
2015 deaths
People from Pszczyna
Members of the Polish Sejm 2011–2015